Paradise Is There: The New Tigerlily Recordings is the seventh studio album by American singer-songwriter Natalie Merchant, released on November 6, 2015 by Nonesuch Records. It is a collection of new recordings of the songs from Merchant's solo debut, Tigerlily (1995).

Critical reception

Upon release, Paradise Is There: The New Tigerlily Recordings received positive acclaim from music critics. At Metacritic, which assigns a normalized rating out of 100 based on reviews from critics, the album has a weighted average of 78 based on reviews from 5 critics, indicating "generally favorable reviews".

Track listing

Personnel
Credits for Paradise Is There: The New Tigerlily Recordings adapted from Tidal and Nonesuch Records' official website.

Musicians

 Natalie Merchant - lead vocals (all tracks), writing
 Jesse Murphy - acoustic bass, bass
 Gabriel Gordon - acoustic guitar, background vocals, electric guitar
 Simi Stone - background vocals
 Bella Blasko - background vocals (4)
 Elizabeth Mitchell - background vocals (4, 6)
 Gail Ann Dorsey - background vocals (11)
 Stanley Moore - cello
 Allison Miller - drums
 Uri Sharlin - piano, accordion
 Sharel Cassity - tenor saxophone
 Marandi Hostetter - viola
 Scott Moore - violin
 Shawn Moore - violin

Technical

 Eli Walker - engineering, editing
 George Cowan - engineering
 Scott Hull - mastering
 Randall Craig Felischer - orchestration (2)
 Tony Finno - string quintet (2), string arrangement (8)
 Stephen Barber - string arrangement (4)
 Sean O'Loughlin - string arrangement (5)
 Uri Sharlin - string arrangement (7)
 Arthur Moorehead - production coordination
 Karina Beznicki - production supervisor
 Jennifer McKinley - project coordinator
 Matthew Rankin - project coordinator
 Summer Damon - project coordinator
 Natalie Merchant - liner notes, production
 John Huba - photography

Charts

References

2015 albums
Natalie Merchant albums
Nonesuch Records albums